Montauk Downs State Park is a state park in Montauk, New York, United States. Montauk Downs State Park includes an 18-hole championship golf course, driving range, tennis courts, swimming pool, and restaurant facilities.

History
The golf course traces its history back to a private course originally developed by Carl G. Fisher in 1927, with Captain H.C. Tippet as its architect.  Two years earlier, Fisher had purchased  in Montauk in hopes of turning it into the "Miami of the North."  Other Fisher projects included the Montauk Manor, Montauk Yacht Club, and a six-story office building in downtown Montauk.  Fisher lost his fortune in the 1929 Stock Market Crash.

The golf course, along with the Montauk Manor, was taken over by a group of private investors in 1966 and became known as the Montauk Golf and Racquet Club. Robert Trent Jones redesigned the golf course two years later and a new clubhouse was also constructed, replacing the original clubhouse designed by Stanford White, which had been destroyed by a fire.  The private club eventually fell into bankruptcy and was purchased by New York State in 1978.

The large area of land within the golf course south of the fifth and sixth holes was originally planned to be developed with a series of condominium complexes similar in design to the Villas of Montauk Downs on Fairway Place, a 24-unit complex that opened in 1980.  Another 24-unit condominium complex named Harbor Ridge opened at the end of Fairway Place in 1988, while the remainder of the land has remained undeveloped.  A small population of sandplain gerardia is found near this area, a wildflower on the federal endangered species list, which prompted a land swap in the siting of the Harbor Ridge development.

Montauk Downs has been consistently rated as one of America's top public golf courses.  In 2009, it was ranked second overall in the Golf World list of Reader's Choice Awards for overall value, behind the Bethpage Black Course, and ranked 38th overall in Golfweeks list of the Best Municipal Courses.  Before the advent of the current telephone reservation system, some golfers would sleep in their cars overnight to get morning tee times at Montauk Downs, particularly on weekends during the summer. Although the idea of creating a second golf course in Montauk at Camp Hero State Park was once under consideration, it was dropped in 1999 due to environmental concerns.

Rees Jones, the son of Robert Trent Jones, began helping to redesign some of the holes at Montauk Downs in 2002. Renovations have included moving back tee boxes to lengthen holes and bring hazards back into play (accounting for recent advances in equipment that allow balls to be hit further distances), reconstructing the bunkers and installing a new irrigation system.  These improvements are being made gradually to avoid interrupting play. Every year Montauk Downs holds a gala event at the end of the summer to help raise money for the golf course renovations.

Course layout
With both the Atlantic Ocean and Block Island Sound located nearby, the golf course is one of the windiest locations in the country and weather conditions can make the course play differently each day.  Most of the holes have small greens that require precision approach shots over bunkers and there are five water hazards on the course.  The 12th hole at Montauk Downs is considered one of Long Island's toughest holes. The 228 yard par 3 has an elevated tee and green, requiring players to carry a deep valley of fescue grass.  The green is guarded by three sand traps, including two deep bunkers in the front.

Staff
The general manager of Montauk Downs and the other state parks in Montauk is Tom Dess.  Charlie Reidlinger serves as the superintendent of the golf course.  Before coming to Montauk Downs, he was the superintendent of the Red Course at Bethpage State Park and the assistant superintendent of the Black Course. The current head golf professional at Montauk Downs is Mark Fretto.

See also
 List of New York state parks

References

External links

 Montauk Downs State Park
 Montauk Downs Golf News & Details at LongIslandGolfNews.com

East Hampton (town), New York
State parks of New York (state)
Golf clubs and courses in New York (state)
Golf clubs and courses designed by Robert Trent Jones
Parks in Suffolk County, New York
Sports venues in Suffolk County, New York